Chu Teh-Chun or Zhu Dequn (24 October 1920 – 26 March 2014) was a Chinese-French abstract painter acclaimed for his pioneering style integrating traditional Chinese painting techniques with Western abstract art.  Chu Teh-Chun enrolled in the National School of Fine Arts (now China Academy of Art), where he studied under Fang Ganmin and Wu Dayu. He was the first ethnic Chinese member of the Académie des Beaux-Arts of France, and together with Wu Guanzhong and Zao Wou-Ki were dubbed the "Three Musketeers" of modernist Chinese artists trained in China and France.

Early life and education
Chu Teh-Chun was born in 1920 in the town of Baitu in Xiao County, which was then in Jiangsu province but now part of Anhui province. In 1935 he entered the National School of Fine Arts (now China Academy of Art) in Hangzhou, Zhejiang, graduating in 1941. At the school he studied Chinese painting under Pan Tianshou and Western art under Fang Ganmin and Wu Dayu., who were prominent Chinese artists trained in France. Among his schoolmates were Wu Guanzhong and Zao Wou-Ki. The three, dubbed the "Three Musketeers" of Chinese modernist art, were all elected as members of the Académie des Beaux-Arts. It was owing to Chu's influence that Wu Guanzhong decided to abandon engineering and become an artist.

Career
In 1945 Chu became a faculty member of the architecture department of the National Central University in Nanjing, then China's capital. With the communist victory in mainland China, Chu moved to Taiwan in 1949, joining the National Taiwan Normal University where he taught Western-style painting. He moved to Paris in 1955, where he lived for the rest of his life. He became a French citizen in 1980, and a member of the Académie des Beaux-Arts in 1997.

In April 1956, Chu painted an oil on canvas portrait of his wife Tung Ching-Chao (董景昭), which won the silver medal at the Paris Salon. Chu called the painting his "lucky star", after which his career became increasingly successful. Wu Guanzhong praised the painting as the "Mona Lisa of the East".

Inspired by Nicolas de Staël's abstract landscape paintings, Chu abandoned figurative painting and adopted a unique style using bold strokes of colour which evoked Chinese calligraphy. His new style was immediately successful. In 1964, an exhibition of his works at the Carnegie Museum of Art in Pittsburgh brought him international fame. On 17 December 1997, Chu was elected a member of the Académie des Beaux-Arts of France, the first Frenchman of Chinese origin to be chosen. He was also made a Chevalier de l’Ordre des Palmes Académiques and Chevalier de la Légion d’Honneur in 2001. His paintings are now in the permanent collections of more than 50 museums all over the world. Major exhibitions of his work were held at the Shanghai Art Museum in 2005 and Beijing's National Art Museum of China in 2010.

In 2003, Chu donated an oil painting to the Shanghai Grand Theatre for its fifth anniversary. The painting now decorates the theatre's central lobby. At the unveiling ceremony, Chu called the painting his biggest and best work.

Art market
In November 2013, an untitled oil on canvas diptych painted by Chu in 1963 was sold for HK$70.7 million (US$9.1 million) at an auction in Hong Kong, setting his personal record. His previous record was another diptych entitled "La Foret Blanche II", which was sold at auction in 2012 for HK$60 million, or $7.7 million USD

According to the Hurun Art List, the total value of Chu's artworks sold in 2013 at public auction was US$65 million, ranking third among all living Chinese artists, behind only Zeng Fanzhi and Fan Zeng.

Death
On 26 March 2014, Chu Teh-Chun died in Paris at age 93, closely following the deaths of his friends and fellow modern artists Wu Guanzhong in 2010 and Zao Wou-Ki in 2013.

References

External links
 Chu Teh-Chun: Nature Lives with Me, Waddington Custot, London, 2017
CHU TEH CHUN: Nature in Abstraction at de Sarthe Gallery, Hong Kong

1920 births
2014 deaths
Abstract painters
Republic of China painters
20th-century French painters
French male painters
21st-century French painters
Members of the Académie des beaux-arts
Chinese emigrants to France
China Academy of Art alumni
Painters from Anhui
People from Suzhou, Anhui
Academic staff of the National Taiwan Normal University
Academic staff of Nanjing University
Educators from Anhui